Glenfield was a New Zealand parliamentary electorate for four terms, from 1984 to 1996. It was represented by two members of parliament, first Judy Keall of the Labour Party, and then Peter Hilt of the National Party. Hilt defected to United New Zealand in 1995.

Population centres
The 1981 census had shown that the North Island had experienced further population growth, and three additional general seats were created through the 1983 electoral redistribution, bringing the total number of electorates to 95. The South Island had, for the first time, experienced a population loss, but its number of general electorates was fixed at 25 since the 1967 electoral redistribution. More of the South Island population was moving to Christchurch, and two electorates were abolished, while two electorates were recreated. In the North Island, six electorates were newly created (including Glenfield), three electorates were recreated, and six electorates were abolished.

This suburban electorate was on the North Shore of Auckland.

History
Labour's Judy Keall was the electorate's first representative in 1984. Hilt defected to United New Zealand in 1995.

The electorate was abolished in the 1996 election, the first mixed-member proportional (MMP) election. It was absorbed into the Northcote electorate.

Members of Parliament
Key

Election results

1993 election

1990 election

1987 election

1984 election

Notes

References

Historical electorates of New Zealand
Politics of the Auckland Region
1984 establishments in New Zealand
1996 disestablishments in New Zealand